Via Mala is a 1961 West German drama film directed by Paul May and starring Gert Fröbe, Joachim Hansen and Christine Kaufmann. It is an adaptation of the 1934 novel Via Mala by John Knittel, which had previously been made into a film in 1945. After a tyrannical father in a small Swiss village is killed, almost everyone he knows comes under suspicion of having murdered him.

Cast

References

Bibliography

External links 
 

1961 films
West German films
German drama films
German black-and-white films
1961 drama films
1960s German-language films
Films about domestic violence
Films based on Swiss novels
Films based on works by John Knittel
Films directed by Paul May
Films set in Switzerland
Films set in the Alps
Remakes of German films
Gloria Film films
1960s German films